is a passenger railway station located in the city of Chōfu, Tokyo, Japan, operated by the private railway operator Keio Corporation

Lines 

Station Layout
This station consists of two opposed elevated side platforms serving two tracks, with the station building located underneath.

Platforms

History
It was renamed Keio-tamagawa Station on May 1, 1937.

Passenger statistics
In fiscal 2019, the station was used by an average of 17,021 passengers daily. 

The passenger figures (boarding passengers only) for previous years are as shown below.

Surrounding area
 Keiokaku Velodrome

See also
 List of railway stations in Japan

References

External links

  

Railway stations in Japan opened in 1916
Keio Sagamihara Line
Stations of Keio Corporation
Railway stations in Tokyo
Chōfu, Tokyo